Éliane Jacq (born 4 July 1948 at Brest and died on 1 March 2011 at Lorient) was a French athlete who specialised in the 400 meters.

Career 
She won the silver medal in the 4 × 400 Metres Relay during the 1969 European Championships along with Bernadette Martin,  Nicole Duclos and Colette Besson.  The French team set a new world record in the discipline of 3 min 30 s 8, but came second to the United Kingdom in a  photo-finish, with both teams recording the same time.

She won  the 1970 French 400m championship (53 9 s) and was French  Indoor 400m champion in 1974.

She died on 1 March 2011 at Lorient, following a long illness.

Prize list

Records 
Her personal bests were 12 s 1 (100 m) (1966) 23 s 9 (200 m) (1973) and 53 s 9 (400 m) (1970).

Notes and references

External links 
Docathlé 2003, s. 176, 215, 412.   French Athletics Federation, 2003.

French female sprinters
1948 births
2011 deaths
European Athletics Championships medalists
20th-century French women